Okon is both a surname and a given name. Notable people with the name include:

Surname:
Paul Okon, Australian footballer
Akpan Okon, 17th century African king
Kakpokpo Okon, 17th century African prince
Effiong Okon, Nigerian boxer
Rick, Okon, German actor

Given name:
Okon Uya, Nigerian governmental official
Okon Flo Essien, Nigerian footballer

See also
Obong Okon Ita, former Kingdom now in Nigeria